The Puzzle Adventure book series from Usborne Publishing Ltd was first created in 1984 with the release of Escape from Blood Castle. The first three volumes of the series were originally released as "Usborne Solve It Yourself". Each book contains a vividly illustrated story, with a plot-related puzzle to solve on each double page.

The series's success inspired the creation of three related series: Advanced Puzzle Adventures, Young Puzzle Adventures and Science Puzzle Adventures.

Many of the Puzzle Adventures and Young Puzzle Adventures series have been re-released over the past few years.

Series

Puzzle Adventures
This is the original series of books, aimed at 8 to 13 year-olds.

Some of these books were re-printed in the following omnibuses:

The Usborne Book of Puzzle Adventures  Collecting: The Incredible Dinosaur Expedition, The Intergalactic Bus Trip, Time Train to Ancient Rome.
The Second Usborne Book of Puzzle Adventures  Collecting: Danger at Demon’s Cove, Search for the Sunken City, Journey to the Lost Temple.
The Third Usborne Book of Puzzle Adventures  Collecting: The Pyramid Plot, The Emerald Conspiracy, The Invisible Spy.
The Fourth Usborne Book of Puzzle Adventures  Collecting: Voyage to the Edge of the World, Mutiny at Crossbones Bay, Castle of Intrigue.
The Usborne Book of Solve Your Own Mystery Stories  Collecting: Escape from Blood Castle, The Curse of the Lost Idol, Murder on the Midnight Plane.
The Usborne Big Book of Puzzle Adventures  Collecting: Danger at Demon’s Cove, Incredible Dinosaur Expedition, Ghost in the Mirror, Escape from Blood Castle.
Puzzle Adventure Omnibus Vol.1  Collecting: Escape from Blood Castle, The Curse of the Lost Idol, Murder on the Midnight Plane, The Incredible Dinosaur Expedition, The Intergalactic Bus Trip, Time Train to Ancient Rome, Danger at Demon’s Cove.
Puzzle Adventure Omnibus Vol.2  Collecting: Agent Arthur’s Jungle Journey, Agent Arthur on the Stormy Seas, Agent Arthur’s Arctic Adventure, The Haunted Tower, The Vanishing Village, The Ghost in the Mirror, Search for the Sunken City.
Puzzle Adventure Omnibus Vol.3  Collecting: Mutiny at Crossbones Bay, Agent Arthur’s Island Adventure, The Pyramid Plot, Castle of Intrigue, The Emerald Conspiracy, Journey to the Lost Temple, The Dark, Dark Knight.
Agent Arthur's Puzzle Adventures  Collecting: Agent Arthur’s Jungle Journey, Agent Arthur on the Stormy Seas, Agent Arthur’s Arctic Adventure.
Ghost Puzzle Adventures  Collecting: The Vanishing Village, The Haunted Tower, The Ghost in the Mirror.

Advanced Puzzle Adventures
This is a more difficult series aimed at older children, currently out of print.

Codename Quicksilver
Cobra Consignment
Mystery on Main Street

The entire series was reprinted in an omnibus edition.

The Usborne Book of Advanced Puzzle Adventures

Science Puzzle Adventures
The Science Puzzle Adventures series written by Clive Gifford contains science-related puzzles.  Each tale pits the wits of Dr. Genius and his resourceful team against the world's most evil criminal superbrains. This series is also currently out of print.

The Flask of Doom
The Time Warp Virus

Young Puzzle Adventures
This series uses softer illustrations and is aimed at younger children.

Some of these books were re-printed in the following omnibuses:

Young Puzzle Adventures  Collecting: Molly's Magic Carpet, Wendy the Witch, Uncle Pete the Pirate, Lucy and the Sea Monster.

Superpuzzles

In 1995 Usborne released a 3-in-1 collection of even more advanced puzzles, The Usborne Book of Superpuzzles by Sarah Dixon, Mark Fowler, Radhi Parekh (illustrator) (ISBN 9780746007358, ISBN10: 0746007353). This includes the books Maps and Maze Puzzles, Codes and Ciphers and Logic Puzzles.

External links
 Usborne.co.uk, the official site of Usborne Publishing

Usborne
Puzzle books